Amy Trask (Born April 21, 1961) is an American sports executive, author, and lawyer from California. She is the former CEO of the Oakland Raiders. Trask has also been referred to as the "Princess of Darkness" by Raiders fans.

Education
Trask grew up in the Brentwood district of Los Angeles and graduated from University of California, Berkeley in 1982 with a B.A. degree in political science. She became a fan of the Oakland Raiders while attending Berkeley and was a member of Phi Beta Kappa. After graduating from Berkeley, Trask received a J.D. from the University of Southern California Gould School of Law. She began law school in 1982, the same year the Oakland Raiders moved to Los Angeles.

Career with the Raiders
In 1983, Trask interned at the Los Angeles Raiders legal department. Trask was admitted to the State Bar of California in 1985. Trask began her legal career at a law firm in Los Angeles and rejoined the Raiders in 1987. Trask was appointed Chief Executive of the Raiders in 1997.  She resigned from the Raiders on May 11, 2013. After her resignation, Trask was referred to as the “glue” that held the organization together.

Today
Since 2013, Trask has served as an analyst for CBS Sports and CBS Sports Network, appearing regularly on That Other Pregame Show and periodically on The NFL Today. Trask is one of the original group of panelists appearing on the first-ever all-women's sports talk show, We Need To Talk on CBS Sports Network. Trask has also written a book titled You Negotiate Like a Girl on her experience as an executive in the NFL.

As of 2022, Trask also serves as Chairman of the Board of Big3, a 3-on-3 professional basketball league. Trask served as CEO of Big3 during its inaugural season that began in June 2017.

Trask received a 2017 WISE Woman of the Year Award awarded by Women in Sports and Events (WISE), a 2018 Campanile Excellence in Achievement Award awarded by the UC Berkeley Foundation and the Cal Alumni Association (University of California at Berkeley), and a 2020 Top Women in Media Award awarded by Cynopsis Media.  In 2019, as part of the National Football League's commemoration of its 100-year anniversary, Trask was named as one of the top 100 Greatest Game Changers in NFL history.

References

1961 births
Living people
American women in business
Oakland Raiders executives
Lawyers from Los Angeles
UC Berkeley College of Letters and Science alumni
USC Gould School of Law alumni
Businesspeople from Los Angeles
Women in American professional sports management
American women lawyers
California lawyers
People from Brentwood, Los Angeles
Women National Football League executives
21st-century American women